Langston Hughes High School (LHHS) is a public secondary school located in Fairburn, Georgia, United States, a suburb of metropolitan Atlanta. LHHS is in South Fulton County adjacent to Renaissance Elementary and Renaissance Middle School.

History
The school was completed in May 2009, and opened its doors in August 2009 to educate students in the southern portion of the Fulton County School System. The school was named after Langston Hughes, an American poet, social activist, novelist, playwright, and columnist from Joplin, Missouri. It serves grades 9–12 with an enrollment of 2600. Langston Hughes High School offers dual enrollment programs lead by Ms. Sandra Allen. As of 2021–2022, the principal is Octavious Harris.

Extracurricular activities
Fall sports
Cheerleading
Cross country
Football
Softball
Volleyball

Winter sports
Cheerleading
Boys' basketball
Girls' basketball
Wrestling

Spring sports
Baseball
Golf
Boys' soccer
Girls' soccer
Boys' tennis
Girls' tennis
Boys' track and field
Girls' track and field

Fine Arts
Chorus
Theatre
Dance

Notable alumni
 Gunna, rapper
 D'Andre Walker, football player
 Yung Bans, rapper

References

External links
Langston Hughes High School

Educational institutions established in 2009
Public high schools in Georgia (U.S. state)
Schools in Fulton County, Georgia
2009 establishments in Georgia (U.S. state)